HD 33283 b is an exoplanet orbiting around HD 33283. The mass of the planet is about 1/3 that of Jupiter or about the same as Saturn. However, the planet orbits very close to the star, taking only 18 days to complete its orbit with average speed of 86.5 km/s (311400 km/h). Despite this, its orbit is eccentric, bringing it as close as 0.075 AU to the star and as far away as 0.215 AU.

See also
 HD 33564 b
 HD 86081 b
 HD 224693 b

References

External links
 

Lepus (constellation)
Exoplanets discovered in 2006
Giant planets
Exoplanets detected by radial velocity